Rakuten Advertising, formerly known as Rakuten Marketing, is an affiliate marketing service provider. The company, in 2005, claimed it was the largest pay-for-performance affiliate marketing network on the Internet.  In 2005, Rakuten acquired LinkShare for US$425 million in cash, making LinkShare a wholly owned U.S. division of Rakuten, Inc., a Japanese shopping portal. Rakuten LinkShare was re-branded to Rakuten Affiliate Network in 2014. In 2020, Rakuten Marketing was renamed as Rakuten Advertising.

References

External links

Affiliate marketing
Online advertising services and affiliate networks
Companies based in New York City
Marketing companies established in 1996
Rakuten
2005 mergers and acquisitions